This is a list of New Zealand television events and premieres which occurred in 1996, the 36th year of continuous operation of television in New Zealand.

Events
2 February – After a long absence, the popular Australian children's television series Johnson and Friends returns to New Zealand television with the series now airing on TV One.
20 February – The second series of Johnson and Friends began airing on New Zealand television for the very first time on TV One.
11 March – The third series of Johnson and Friends was shown for the first time in New Zealand as it went to air on TV One (The third series itself was also filmed in New Zealand at Avalon Studios in Avalon).
14 March – Journalist Carol Hirschfeld took over as presenter of TV One's investigative news and current affairs programme Assignment.
15 July – New Zealand soap opera City Life premiered on TV2.
19 July – Australian soap opera Neighbours screened on TVNZ's TV One for the last time. The soap was picked up by TV4 a year later and ran from 1997 until 2000. It returned to TVNZ in 2002 and has been broadcasting on TV2 since.
20 July – TV One adopted new sans serif logo, replacing the Friz Quadranta which had been in use since 1987.
20 July – The 1996 Summer Olympics were held in Atlanta, Georgia, United States, where New Zealand won 3 gold medals, 2 silver medals, and 1 bronze medal.
31 August – New Zealand children's television show produced in Dunedin Squirt debuted on TV3. Within the next year, it moved to TV2.
1 November - Cartoon Network screened for the first time on HBO running from 6am to 4pm daily. HBO extended its transmission hours and ran from 4pm until Cartoon Network resumed at 6am the following day.

Debuts

Domestic
15 July – City Life (TV2) (1996–1998)
31 August – Squirt (TV3) (1996–2006)

International
3 January –  The Single Guy (TV2)
4 January –  The Final Cut (TV One)
19 January –  Brotherly Love (TV3)
19 January –  Weird Science (TV3)
2 February – / Hercules: The Legendary Journeys (TV3)
5 February –  JAG (TV2)
12 February –  Nowhere Man (TV3)
13 February –  American Gothic (TV3)
20 February –  Caroline in the City (TV2) 
26 February –  Burke's Law (TV3)
9 March –  Pets Win Prizes (TV2)
18 March –  Gargoyles (TV3)
22 March –  New York Undercover (TV3)
25 March –  Central Park West (TV3)
15 April –  Murder One (TV3)
2 April –  3rd Rock from the Sun (TV3)
29 April –  Water Rats (TV2)
5 June –  Star Trek: Voyager (TV3)
19 June – / Xena: Warrior Princess (TV3)
7 August –  Savannah (TV3)
14 August –  Sex/Life (TV3)
19 August –  Almost Perfect (TV2)
19 August –  Ned and Stacey (TV2) 
30 October –  Doctor Who: The Movie (TV2) 
 Wishbone (TV One)

Changes to network affiliation
This is a list of programs which made their premiere on a New Zealand television network that had previously premiered on another New Zealand television network. The networks involved in the switch of allegiances are predominantly both free-to-air networks or both subscription television networks. Programs that have their free-to-air/subscription television premiere, after previously premiering on the opposite platform (free-to air to subscription/subscription to free-to air) are not included. In some cases, programs may still air on the original television network. This occurs predominantly with programs shared between subscription television networks.

International

Television shows
No information on television shows this year.

Ending this year
Wheel of Fortune (TV2) (1991–1996)